The springar is a Norwegian couple's folk dance with an uneven  rhythm, traditionally danced by a man and a woman.  The man is given more opportunity to improvise his moves.

References

Norwegian folk dances
Norwegian folk music
Dance in Norway